Highgrove is a census-designated place (CDP) and an unincorporated community in Riverside County, California, United States. The population was 3,988 at the 2010 census, up from 3,445 at the 2000 census. The latest 2020 census shows 7,515 total population, an 88.4% increase from last 2010 census, which makes it the fastest-growing location in entire Riverside County.

The city of Riverside, California has plans to annex Highgrove in the near future. Currently at Spring Mountain Ranch community, Avalon, Cambria, and Sonoma (all opening by February 2022) are the three, newest largest master-planned communities being built at the Highgrove eastside area. Soon, Compass and Pinnacle at Summit Canyon by PulteGroup, at the south-east corner-end of Highgrove on the higher-elevation foothill, will open in 2023. These are the only known, brand-new homes currently available for sale, closer to Downtown Riverside and University of California, Riverside campus. In addition, 846 new urban-style townhomes by Lennar, plus its first new retail store in the area, will begin construction in 2023, next to the elementary school.

This community publishes its own newsletter, Highgrove Happenings, each month, since 1994.

History
Highgrove was founded in 1886, originally called East Riverside, but in 1897 during a naming contest, it was renamed to Highgrove, after not getting it confused with the city of Riverside. Citrus-farm growers have occupied Highgrove area since beginning of history, with its superior fresh-wind conditions from the west, blowing into east of a cove-shape like terrain, making it one the most valuable places in Inland Empire for citrus-farming by generations of farmers. Due to the stronger wind conditions that can easily move air out, a landfill dumping ground was opened in 1947 for discarded farm waste. Originally, it operated as a fire-burn dump during the 1950s, until 1960 when there was a concern of heavy-smog in southern California.

In 1970, the Highgrove Agricultural Preserve conservation was formed in order to support the growing number of orange trees from farmers. More diverse of citrus fruits were being grown for the packing houses in Riverside. However, farming output could only peaked by the mid-1980s. More competition on fruit prices had increased daily from new farming businesses in the Central California region. Highgrove's another biggest threat was its rising land-value and water cost for the groves by the end of 1980s, due to its close-proximity to downtown Riverside, which made farm crops more unprofitable. By 1990, the preserve contract was not renewed, citing increases of population density, housing shortage, traffic jam, and smog near Riverside. Citrus (mostly orange) trees were gradually phased out and torn down completely by the year 2000.

The Highgrove sanitary landfill closed permanently in 1998, after 51 years of operation. Since the 2018 inspection yearly report, no methane output has been detected in any of the designated area. Today, new construction homes occupy near front of it, across Pigeon Pass Road. The citrus industry declined in the area as more agricultural areas were replaced by new subdivisions. In 2007, Spring Mountain Ranch master-planned community was originally conceived by RWR Homes, but construction halted due to the 2008 recession, and now KB Home, in 2014, will be completing this long-awaited project today, with no HOA fee as its main selling point. Other builders included are D.R. Horton, Lennar, and PulteGroup with some HOA fee.

Future Annexation
Currently, Highgrove is experiencing a transformation with over 2,500 new single-family homes and 846 new townhomes proposed at the eastside, at the once former Highgrove Agricultural Preserve that was officially diminished by 2008. To improve its infrastructure with new businesses and commercial buildings, Highgrove is currently the only area in Riverside County where cannabis dispensary stores are allowed to open within 250 ft. apart. Up to 10 cannabis stores are being considered within a one-half mile corridor along the I-215 freeway. At present, 4 locations have been approved, while the 5th is seeking approval from the planning department. Based upon its census data, 8 locations can be approved within the current Highgrove boundaries, as more new homes, townhomes, and apartments are being built, while gradually demolishing old agricultural and warehouse buildings later sold from land value appreciation.

The, once, agricultural area of Highgrove will become more integrated and urbanized into a new college-town, upscale neighborhood of Riverside. Downtown Riverside is expanding its new boundary lines, further, into east of 91 & 215 freeway area for future developments and spreading up north to Highgrove on Main St. northern-end point, just before the San Bernardino County borderline of Grand Terrace. New boundary line from the map looking like crescent-shaped east of 60/215 freeway, starting from UC Riverside campus of the southeast, next to Highgrove of the northwest, and then to Spring Mountain Ranch community of the northeast. In addition, a new K-8 school building is planned, plus new cannabis dispensary stores and retail businesses that will be opened and within easy reach for University of California, Riverside students, alumni, investors, and new generation of young homeowners and renters in transformative Highgrove area.

With nearby UC Riverside's new permanent slogan as the nation's leader for social mobility and diverse/inclusive community, pioneering research with impacts around the globe, some critics believe that Highgrove should be transformed into a tourist destination, where all educators, scholars, social leaders, and philanthropists around the world gather into one new, possible, research center in the area.

Geography
Highgrove is between the city of Riverside and Grand Terrace. It is located east of Interstate 215 and north of the University of California, Riverside campus.

The highest-elevation point in Highgrove with homes built is up to 1,420 feet at the eastside.

Demographics

2020
As of the 2020 census, Highgrove had a population of 7,515, an 88.4% increase from last 2010 census.

2010
As of the 2010 census, Highgrove had a population of 3,988. The racial makeup of Highgrove was 2,104 (52.8%) White, 162 (4.1%) African American, 41 (1.0%) Native American, 113 (2.8%) Asian, 13 (0.3%) Pacific Islander, 1,388 (34.8%) from other races, and 167 (4.2%) from two or more races. Hispanic or Latino of any race were 2,604 persons (65.3%).

The census reported that 3,982 people (99.8% of the population) lived in households, 6 (0.2%) lived in non-institutionalized group quarters, and no one was institutionalized.

There were 1,136 households, 553 (48.7%) had children under the age of 18 living in them, 610 (53.7%) were opposite-sex married couples living together, 188 (16.5%) had a female householder with no husband present, 102 (9.0%) had a male householder with no wife present. There were 101 (8.9%) unmarried opposite-sex partnerships, and 6 (0.5%) same-sex married couples or partnerships. 181 households (15.9%) were one person and 50 (4.4%) had someone living alone who was 65 or older. The average household size was 3.51. There were 900 families (79.2% of households); the average family size was 3.90.

The age distribution was 1,246 people (31.2%) under the age of 18, 464 people (11.6%) aged 18 to 24, 1,038 people (26.0%) aged 25 to 44, 952 people (23.9%) aged 45 to 64, and 288 people (7.2%) who were 65 or older. The median age was 30.2 years. For every 100 females, there were 102.8 males.  For every 100 females age 18 and over, there were 101.9 males.

There were 1,227 housing units at an average density of 381.2 per square mile, of the occupied units 633 (55.7%) were owner-occupied and 503 (44.3%) were rented. The homeowner vacancy rate was 2.8%; the rental vacancy rate was 7.5%.  2,217 people (55.6% of the population) lived in owner-occupied housing units and 1,765 people (44.3%) lived in rental housing units.

2000
From the 2000 census, there were 3,445 people, 1,026 households, and 777 families in the CDP. The racial makeup of the CDP was 54.0% White, 4.3% Black or African American, 1.1% Native American, 2.4% Asian, 0.5% Pacific Islander, 33.6% from other races, and 4.1% from two or more races. 56.7% of the population were Hispanic or Latino of any race.
Of the 1,026 households 48.9% had children under the age of 18 living with them, 51.3% were married couples living together, 16.4% had a female householder with no husband present, and 24.2% were non-families. 16.6% of households were one person and 4.2% were one person aged 65 or older. The average household size was 3.4 and the average family size was 3.8.

The age distribution was 36.4% under the age of 18, 10.1% from 18 to 24, 31.1% from 25 to 44, 16.1% from 45 to 64, and 6.2% 65 or older. The median age was 27 years. For every 100 females, there were 105.9 males. For every 100 females age 18 and over, there were 103.7 males.

The median household income was $30,685 and the median family income  was $33,929. Males had a median income of $32,199 versus $27,177 for females. The per capita income for the CDP was $16,422. About 22.4% of families and 27.8% of the population were below the poverty line, including 38.7% of those under age 18 and 8.2% of those age 65 or over.

Government
Federal:
In the United States Senate, California is represented by Democrats Dianne Feinstein and Alex Padilla.

State:

Local:
In the Riverside County Board of Supervisors, Highgrove is in the Second District, represented by Karen Spiegel.

References

Census-designated places in Riverside County, California
Populated places on the Santa Ana River
Census-designated places in California